The Marimbondo Dam is an embankment dam on the Grande River near Fronteira in Minas Gerais, Brazil. The dam serves an associated hydroelectric power plant with a  installed capacity.

Background
Owned and maintained by Eletrobrás Furnas, the dam was their fourth power plant constructed. Construction began in 1971 and was complete in 1975 when the first generator went online. The last of the eight generators went online in January 1977.

Specifications
In total, the spillway has a  discharge capacity.

Reservoir

Marimbondo Hydroelectric Power Plant

See also
List of power stations in Brazil

References

Dams completed in 1975
Dams in Minas Gerais
Earth-filled dams
Dams on the Rio Grande (Paraná River tributary)